Rodion Igorevich Alimov (born 21 April 1998) is a Russian badminton player. He won the mixed doubles title at the European Junior Championships in 2017 and at the European Championships in 2021.

Career 
Born in Ufa, Alimov made a debut in his international career in 2016, and at the same year, he was selected to join the national team. He won his first international title at the 2016 Bulgaria International partnered with Alina Davletova. He and Davletova clinched the mixed doubles gold medal at the 2017 European Junior Championships, made them as the first Russian player to win that category. At the same year, the duo also won the bronze medal at the 2017 Summer Universiade in Taipei. Alimov and Davletova became the first Russians winning the European Championships in mixed doubles, doing so in 2021.

At the 2022 India Open, Alimov and Alina Davletova had to withdraw from the mixed doubles semifinals match after Alimov was tested positive of COVID-19.

Achievements

European Championships 
Mixed doubles

Summer Universiade 
Mixed doubles

European Junior Championships 
Mixed doubles

BWF World Tour (1 title) 
The BWF World Tour, which was announced on 19 March 2017 and implemented in 2018, is a series of elite badminton tournaments sanctioned by the Badminton World Federation (BWF). The BWF World Tours are divided into levels of World Tour Finals, Super 1000, Super 750, Super 500, Super 300 (part of the HSBC World Tour), and the BWF Tour Super 100.

Mixed doubles

BWF International Challenge/Series (7 titles, 2 runners-up) 
Mixed doubles

  BWF International Challenge tournament
  BWF International Series tournament
  BWF Future Series tournament

References

External links 
 

1998 births
Living people
Sportspeople from Ufa
Russian male badminton players
Universiade medalists in badminton
Universiade bronze medalists for Russia
Medalists at the 2017 Summer Universiade